Mons Maraldi is a 1.3-kilometer-tall mountain on the Moon at 20.3° N, 35.3°E, covering an area about 15 kilometers in diameter. It is named after the nearby crater Maraldi.

See also
List of mountains on the Moon

References

External links

Mons Maraldi at The Moon Wiki
 
 

Maraldi, Mons